The 2013 Cape Verdean Football Championship season was the 34th of the competition of the first-tier football in Cape Verde.  Its started on 11 May and finished on 13 July, slightly earlier than last year.  The tournament was organized by the Cape Verdean Football Federation.  CS Mindelense won the ninth title.  They did not participate in the 2014 CAF Champions League.  In 2014, Mindelense would become the second and most recent club to win both the cup and the super cup title in the same season.

Overview
Sporting Praia was the defending team of the title.  A total of 12 clubs participated in the competition, one from each island league and one who won the last season's title.  More than three clubs shared the same club name starting with Académic- numbering four out of twelve, one less than last season.  Half of Group B clubs would bear the first club name but only half would bear the name in the knockout stage.

The biggest win was Mindelense who scored 4-0 over Ultramarina, other matches that finished with four goals who scored by Desportivo Praia (1-4 over Ultramarina), Solpontense and Académico 83 with four and Desportivo Praia (1-4 over Juventude da Furna).

The season would have one of fewest goals in history after the expansion of the clubs to over ten.  Week one had only one victory of each of six matches, five games were tied, one being one and the remaining zero and made it the worst of any soccer week in Cape Verdean football (soccer) history.  Week two had no points higher than two scored, the remaining three weeks were better, week four had only one and four points of each of the four matches while two games were finished without a single goal.

Participating clubs

 Sporting Clube da Praia, winner of the 2012 Cape Verdean Football Championships
 Onze Estrelas, winner of the Boa Vista Island League
 Juventude da Furna, winner of the Brava Island League
 Académica do Fogo, winner of the Fogo Island League
 Académico 83, winner of the Maio Island League
 Académico do Aeroporto, winner of the Sal Island League
 Solpontense FC, winner of the Santo Antão Island League (North)
 Académica do Porto Novo, winner of the Santo Antão Island League (South)
 FC Ultramarina, winner of the São Nicolau Island League
 CS Mindelense, winner of the São Vicente Island League
 Scorpions Vermelho, winner of the Santiago Island League (North)
 Desportivo da Praia, runner-up of the Santiago Island League (South)

Information about the clubs

League standings
Group A

Group B

Results

Final Stages

Semi-finals

Finals

Statistics
Topscorer: Dukinha: 6 goals (of CS Mindelense)
Biggest win: CS Mindelense 4-0 FC Ultramarina (June 1)

See also
2012–13 in Cape Verdean football

References

External links

Cape Verdean Football Championship seasons
2012–13 in Cape Verdean football
Cape